Atomoxetine, sold under the brand name Strattera, among others, is a medication used to treat attention deficit hyperactivity disorder (ADHD). It may be used alone or along with psychostimulants. It is also used as a cognitive enhancer to improve alertness, attention, and memory. Use of atomoxetine is only recommended for those who are at least six years old. It is taken by mouth. Atomoxetine is a norepinephrine reuptake inhibitor and is believed to work by increasing norepinephrine and dopamine levels in the brain.

Common side effects of atomoxetine include abdominal pain, loss of appetite, nausea, feeling tired, and dizziness. Serious side effects may include angioedema, liver problems, stroke, psychosis, heart problems, suicide, and aggression. There is a lack of data regarding its safety during pregnancy; as of 2019, its safety during pregnancy and for use during breastfeeding is not certain.

It was approved for medical use in the United States in 2002. In 2020, it was the 287th most commonly prescribed medication in the United States, with more than 1million prescriptions.

Medical uses

Atomoxetine is indicated for the treatment of attention-deficit/hyperactivity disorder (ADHD).

Attention deficit hyperactivity disorder
Atomoxetine is approved for use in children, adolescents, and adults. However, its efficacy has not been studied in children under six years old. One of the primary differences with the standard stimulant treatments for ADHD is that it has little known abuse potential. While it has been shown to significantly reduce inattentive and hyperactive symptoms, the responses were lower than the response to stimulants. Additionally, 40% of participants who were treated with atomoxetine experienced residual ADHD symptoms.

While its efficacy may be less than that of stimulant medications, there is some evidence that it may be used in combination with stimulants. Doctors may prescribe non-stimulants including atomoxetine when a person has bothersome side effects from stimulants; when a stimulant was not effective; in combination with a stimulant to increase effectiveness; or when there is concern about the abuse potential of psychostimulants in a patient with a history of drug use disorder.

Unlike α2 adrenoceptor agonists such as guanfacine and clonidine, atomoxetine's use can be abruptly stopped without significant discontinuation effects being seen.

The initial therapeutic effects of atomoxetine usually take 1 to 4 weeks to become apparent. A further 2 to 4 weeks may be required for the full therapeutic effects to be seen. Incrementally increasing response may occur up to 1 year or longer. The maximum recommended total daily dose in children and adolescents over 70 kg and adults is 100 mg.

Contraindications
Contraindications include:

 Any cardiovascular disease including:
 Moderate to severe hypertension
 Atrial fibrillation
 Atrial flutter
 Ventricular tachycardia
 Ventricular fibrillation
 Ventricular flutter
 Advanced arteriosclerosis
 Severe cardiovascular disorders
 Uncontrolled hyperthyroidism
 Pheochromocytoma
 Concomitant treatment with monoamine oxidase inhibitors
 Narrow angle glaucoma

Adverse effects 
Common side effects include abdominal pain, loss of appetite, nausea, feeling tired, and dizziness. Serious side effects may include angioedema, liver problems, stroke, psychosis, heart problems, suicide, and aggression. A 2020 meta-analysis found that atomoxetine was associated with anorexia, weight loss, and hypertension, rating it as a "potentially least preferred agent based on safety" for treating ADHD. As of 2019, safety in pregnancy and breastfeeding is not clear; a 2018 review stated that, "[b]ecause of lack of data, the treating
physician should consider stopping atomoxetine treatment in women with ADHD during pregnancy."

The U.S. Food and Drug Administration (FDA) has issued a black box warning for suicidal behavior/ideation. Similar warnings have been issued in Australia. Unlike stimulant medications, atomoxetine does not have abuse liability or the potential to cause withdrawal effects on abrupt discontinuation.

Incidence of adverse effects
Very common (>10% incidence) adverse effects include:
 Diarrhea (43%)
 Nausea (26%)
 Xerostomia (Dry mouth) (20%)
 Appetite loss (16%)
 Insomnia (15%)
 Fatigue (10%)
 Headache
 Cough
 Vomiting (in children and adolescents)

Common (1–10% incidence) adverse effects include:

Uncommon (0.1–1% incidence) adverse effects include:

Rare (0.01–0.1% incidence) adverse effects including:

 Raynaud's phenomenon
 Abnormal/increased liver function tests
 Jaundice
 Hepatitis
 Liver injury
 Acute liver failure
 Urinary retention
 Priapism
 Male genital pain

Overdose
Atomoxetine is relatively non-toxic in overdose. Single-drug overdoses involving over 1500 mg of atomoxetine have not resulted in death. The most common symptoms of overdose include:

 Gastrointestinal symptoms
 Somnolence
 Dizziness
 Tremor
 Abnormal behaviour
 Hyperactivity
 Agitation
 Dry mouth
 Tachycardia
 Hypertension
 Mydriasis

Less common symptoms:
 Seizures
 QTc interval prolongation

The recommended treatment for atomoxetine overdose includes use of activated charcoal to prevent further absorption of the drug.

Interactions 

Atomoxetine is a substrate for CYP2D6. Concurrent treatment with a CYP2D6 inhibitor such as bupropion, fluoxetine, or paroxetine has been shown to increase plasma atomoxetine by 100% or more, as well as increase N-desmethylatomoxetine levels and decrease plasma 4-hydroxyatomoxetine levels by a similar degree.

Atomoxetine has been found to directly inhibit hERG potassium currents with an IC50 of 6.3 μM, which has the potential to cause arrhythmia. QT prolongation has been reported with atomoxetine at therapeutic doses and in overdose; it is suggested that atomoxetine not be used with other medications that may prolong the QT interval, concomitantly with CYP2D6 inhibitors, and caution to be used in poor metabolizers.

Other notable drug interactions include:

 Antihypertensive agents, due to atomoxetine acting as an indirect sympathomimetic
 Indirect-acting sympathomimetics, such as pseudoephedrine, norepinephrine reuptake inhibitors, or MAOIs
 Direct-acting sympathomimetics, such as phenylephrine or other α1 adrenoceptor agonists, including pressors such as dobutamine or isoprenaline and β2 adrenoceptor agonists
 Highly plasma protein-bound drugs: atomoxetine has the potential to displace these drugs from plasma proteins which may potentiate their adverse or toxic effects. In vitro, atomoxetine does not affect the plasma protein binding of aspirin, desipramine, diazepam, paroxetine, phenytoin, or warfarin

Pharmacology

Pharmacodynamics

Atomoxetine inhibits the presynaptic norepinephrine transporter (NET), preventing the reuptake of norepinephrine throughout the brain along with inhibiting the reuptake of dopamine in specific brain regions such as the prefrontal cortex, where dopamine transporter (DAT) expression is minimal. In rats, atomoxetine increased prefrontal cortex catecholamine concentrations without altering dopamine levels in the striatum or nucleus accumbens; in contrast, methylphenidate, a dopamine reuptake inhibitor, was found to increase prefrontal, striatal, and accumbal dopamine levels to the same degree. In addition to rats, atomoxetine has also been found to induce similar region-specific catecholamine level alteration in mice.

Atomoxetine's status as a serotonin transporter (SERT) inhibitor at clinical doses in humans is uncertain. A PET imaging study on rhesus monkeys found that atomoxetine occupied >90% and >85% of neural NET and SERT, respectively. However, both mouse and rat microdialysis studies have failed to find an increase in extracellular serotonin in the prefrontal cortex following acute or chronic atomoxetine treatment. Supporting atomoxetine's selectivity, a human study found no effects on platelet serotonin uptake (a marker of SERT inhibition) and inhibition of the pressor effects of tyramine (a marker of NET inhibition).

Atomoxetine has been found to act as an NMDA receptor antagonist in rat cortical neurons at therapeutic concentrations. It causes a use-dependent open-channel block and its binding site overlaps with the Mg2+ binding site. Atomoxetine's ability to increase prefrontal cortex firing rate in anesthetized rats could not be blocked by D1 or α1-adrenergic receptor antagonists, but could be potentiated by NMDA or an α2-adrenergic receptor antagonist, suggesting a glutaminergic mechanism. In Sprague Dawley rats, atomoxetine reduces NR2B protein content without altering transcript levels. Aberrant glutamate and NMDA receptor function have been implicated in the etiology of ADHD.

Atomoxetine also reversibly inhibits GIRK currents in Xenopus oocytes in a concentration-dependent, voltage-independent, and time-independent manner. Kir3.1/3.2 ion channels are opened downstream of M2, α2, D2, and A1 stimulation, as well as other Gi-coupled receptors. Therapeutic concentrations of atomoxetine are within range of interacting with GIRKs, especially in CYP2D6 poor metabolizers. It is not known whether this contributes to the therapeutic effects of atomoxetine in ADHD.

4-Hydroxyatomoxetine, the major active metabolite of atomoxetine in CYP2D6 extensive metabolizers, has been found to have sub-micromolar affinity for opioid receptors, acting as an antagonist at μ-opioid receptors and a partial agonist at κ-opioid receptors. It is not known whether this action at the kappa-opioid receptor leads to CNS-related adverse effects.

Pharmacokinetics
Orally administered atomoxetine is rapidly and completely absorbed. First-pass metabolism by the liver is dependent on CYP2D6 activity, resulting in an absolute bioavailability of 63% for extensive metabolizers and 94% for poor metabolizers. Maximum plasma concentration is reached in 1–2 hours. If taken with food, the maximum plasma concentration decreases by 10-40% and delays the tmax by 3 hours. Drugs affecting gastric pH have no effect on oral bioavailability.

Atomoxetine has a volume of distribution of 0.85 L/kg, with limited partitioning into red blood cells. It is highly bound to plasma proteins (98.7%), mainly albumin, along with α1-acid glycoprotein (77%) and IgG (15%). Its metabolite N-desmethylatomoxetine is 99.1% bound to plasma proteins, while 4-hydroxyatomoxetine is only 66.6% bound.

The half-life of atomoxetine varies widely between individuals, with an average range of 4.5 to 19 hours. As atomoxetine is metabolized by CYP2D6, exposure may be increased 10-fold in CYP2D6 poor metabolizers. Among CYP2D6 extensive metabolizers, the half-life of atomoxetine averaged 5.34 hours and the half-life of the active metabolite N-desmethylatomoxetine was 8.9 hours. By contrast, among CYP2D6 poor metabolizers the half-life of atomoxetine averaged 20.0 hours and the half-life of N-desmethylatomoxetine averaged 33.3 hours.

Atomoxetine, N-desmethylatomoxetine, and 4-hydroxyatomoxetine produce minimal to no inhibition of CYP1A2 and CYP2C9, but inhibit CYP2D6 in human liver microsomes at concentrations between 3.6 and 17 μmol/L. Plasma concentrations of 4-hydroxyatomoxetine and N-desmethylatomoxetine at steady state are 1.0% and 5% that of atomoxetine in CYP2D6 extensive metabolizers, and are 5% and 45% that of atomoxetine in CYP2D6 poor metabolizers.

Atomoxetine is excreted unchanged in urine at <3% in both extensive and poor CYP2D6 metabolizers, with >96% and 80% of a total dose being excreted in urine, respectively. The fractions excreted in urine as 4-hydroxyatomoxetine and its glucuronide account for 86% of a given dose in extensive metabolizers, but only 40% in poor metabolizers. CYP2D6 poor metabolizers excrete greater amounts of minor metabolites, namely N-desmethylatomoxetine and 2-hydroxymethylatomoxetine and their conjugates.

Pharmacogenomics
Chinese adults homozygous for the hypoactive CYP2D6*10 allele have been found to exhibit two-fold higher area-under-the-curve (AUCs) and 1.5-fold higher maximum plasma concentrations compared to extensive metabolizers.

Japanese men homozygous for CYP2D6*10 have similarly been found to experience two-fold higher AUCs compared to extensive metabolizers.

Chemistry
Atomoxetine, or (−)-methyl[(3R)-3-(2-methylphenoxy)-3-phenylpropylamine, is a white, granular powder that is highly soluble in water.

Synthesis

Detection in biological fluids
Atomoxetine may be quantitated in plasma, serum or whole blood in order to distinguish extensive versus poor metabolizers in those receiving the drug therapeutically, to confirm the diagnosis in potential poisoning victims or to assist in the forensic investigation in a case of fatal overdosage.

History
Atomoxetine is manufactured, marketed, and sold in the United States as the hydrochloride salt (atomoxetine HCl) under the brand name Strattera by Eli Lilly and Company, the original patent-filing company and current U.S. patent owner. Atomoxetine was initially intended to be developed as an antidepressant, but it was found to be insufficiently efficacious for treating depression. It was, however, found to be effective for ADHD and was approved by the FDA in 2002, for the treatment of ADHD. Its patent expired in May 2017. On 12 August 2010, Lilly lost a lawsuit that challenged its patent on Strattera, increasing the likelihood of an earlier entry of a generic into the US market. On 1 September 2010, Sun Pharmaceuticals announced it would begin manufacturing a generic in the United States. In a 29 July 2011 conference call, however, Sun Pharmaceutical's Chairman stated "Lilly won that litigation on appeal so I think [generic Strattera]'s deferred."

In 2017 the FDA approved the generic production of atomoxetine by four pharmaceutical companies.

Society and culture
The drug was originally known as tomoxetine. It was renamed to avoid medication errors, as the name may be confused with tamoxifen.

Brand names
In India, atomoxetine is sold under brand names including Axetra, Axepta, Attera, Tomoxetin, and Attentin. In Australia, Canada, Italy, Portugal, Romania, Spain, Switzerland and the US, atomoxetine is sold under the brand name Strattera. In the Czech Republic it is sold under brand names including Mylan. In Iran, atomoxetine is sold under brand names including Stramox. In 2017, a generic version was approved in the United States.

Research
There has been some suggestion that atomoxetine might be a helpful adjunct in people with major depression, particularly in cases with concomitant ADHD.

Atomoxetine may be used in those with ADHD and bipolar disorder although such use has not been well studied. Some benefit has also been seen in people with ADHD and autism. As with other norepinephrine reuptake inhibitors it appears to reduce anxiety and depression symptoms, although attention has focused mainly on specific patient groups such as those with concurrent ADHD or methamphetamine dependence.

References

Further reading

External links
 
 

Eli Lilly and Company brands
Kappa-opioid receptor agonists
Mu-opioid receptor antagonists
NMDA receptor antagonists
Nootropics
Phenol ethers
Potassium channel blockers
Secondary amines
Serotonin–norepinephrine reuptake inhibitors
Attention deficit hyperactivity disorder management
Wikipedia medicine articles ready to translate
2-Tolyl compounds